The 49th Annual Country Music Association Awards were held on November 4, 2015, at the Bridgestone Arena in Nashville and was hosted by Brad Paisley and Carrie Underwood, marking their eighth year as co-hosts.

The nominations for the 49th CMA Awards were announced on September 9, 2015, on Good Morning America by Steven Tyler and Kelsea Ballerini.

Winners and nominees
The winners are in Bold.

Special Recognition Awards

Performers

Presenters

References 

Country Music Association
CMA
Country Music Association Awards
Country Music Association Awards
November 2015 events in the United States
2015 awards in the United States
21st century in Nashville, Tennessee
Events in Nashville, Tennessee